Subordination may refer to

Subordination in a hierarchy (in military, society, etc.)
 Insubordination, disobedience
Subordination (linguistics)
Subordination (finance)
Subordination agreement, a legal document used to deprecate the claim of one party in favor of another
Subordination (horse), a Thoroughbred racehorse

In mathematics
 Littlewood subordination theorem
 Subordinate partition of unity in paracompact space